The northern spearnose poacher (Agonopsis vulsa), also known as the window-tailed sea-poacher or the windowtail poacher, is a fish in the family Agonidae. It was described by David Starr Jordan and Charles Henry Gilbert in 1880, originally under the genus Agonus. It is a marine, temperate water-dwelling fish which is known from the eastern Pacific Ocean, including southeastern Alaska to southern California, USA.

The northern spearnose poacher is sometimes used as a public aquarium fish.

References

Northern spearnose poacher
Taxa named by David Starr Jordan
Taxa named by Charles Henry Gilbert
Fish described in 1880